Bulverde may refer to:
Bulverde, Texas
Bulverde or PXA27x, an Intel XScale processing chip